The Covilhã Data Center is one of the biggest data centers in the world and the biggest in Portugal. It's part of the Altice Portugal data centers.

See also 
 Altice
 Altice Portugal

References 

Altice Portugal
Data centers